Brian Clevinger (born May 7, 1978) is an American writer best known as the author of the webcomic 8-Bit Theater and the Eisner-nominated print comic Atomic Robo. He is also the author of the self-published novel Nuklear Age.

Career

Webcomics 
Clevinger's webcomic, 8-Bit Theater, which is hosted on his site Nuklear Power, is very loosely based on the video game Final Fantasy I and tells the story of four would-be fantasy heroes, known as the Light Warriors, who set out to save the world from the embodiment of Chaos, but are conflicted over their own stupidity and malice. The comic was created using 8-bit graphic sprites taken primarily from the Final Fantasy NES games, or created by either Clevinger himself or Kevin Sigmund. Spanning 1225 episodes, it ran from March 2, 2001, to June 1, 2010.

In addition to 8-Bit Theater, Clevinger is the creator of two mini-comics: Dynasty Memory, created in 2002 as a parody of the Dynasty Warriors series, and Field of Battle, created in August 2005 as a general parody of first-person shooter games, drawing most of its influence from Battlefield 2.

In 2009, Clevinger started two other webcomics on Nuklear Power. Warbot in Accounting, co-written with artist Zack Finfrock, is about a war machine's struggles with human daily life in a white collar job. How I Killed Your Master, "a kung fu movie, but a comic", is co-written with John Wood and drawn by Matt Speroni.

Print 
Atomic Robo, drawn by Scott Wegener, began as a six-issue limited series published by Red 5 Comics starting in October 2007. It was nominated in the "Best Limited Series" category of the 2008 Eisner Awards, won by The Umbrella Academy.  Colorist Ronda Pattison was also nominated in the "Best Coloring" category subsequently won by Dave Stewart.

It was announced at the 2010 Chicago Comic and Entertainment Expo that Clevinger would be revamping the saga of The Infinity Gauntlet for Marvel Comics' all-ages series Marvel Adventures. Clevinger also revealed that he had contributed writing for two issues of World War Hulks: Wolverine vs. Captain America, which were to be released that summer.

The self-published novel Nuklear Age is largely an extended parody of comic books. The book recounts the adventures of Nuklear Man and his sidekick, Atomik Lad, as they fight against rogue military weapons, highly evolved civilizations, the trials of everyday life, an angst-filled over-villain of undeniable power, the ever exotic Dr. Menace, and their own impulses. A sequel called Atomik Age was planned but never completed.

Style 
Clevinger has stated that "[his] favorite comics are the ones where the jokes are on the reader."

Personal life 
Michael J. Novosel, Clevinger's grandfather, was a United States Army helicopter pilot and recipient of the Medal of Honor.

References 

General sources
 Nuklear Age (December 1, 2004); Brian Clevinger, iUniverse 
 ComiXology podcast interview with Clevinger and Scott Wegener
 Nerdy Show podcast interview with Clevinger

External links 

 Brian Clevinger on Twitter
 Nuklear Power website
 Atomic-Robo website

1978 births
Living people
Place of birth missing (living people)
American webcomic creators
American comics writers